The Last Ride may refer to:

 The Last Ride (novel), a 1995 western novel by Thomas Eidson
 The Last Ride (1931 film), an American crime film
 The Last Ride (1944 film), an American crime film about tire bootleggers
 The Last Ride (1994 film), also known as F.T.W., an American film starring Mickey Rourke
 The Last Ride (2004 film), an American action drama
 Last Ride (film), a 2009 Australian drama
 The Last Ride (2011 film), an American drama about Hank Williams
 The Last Ride (2016 film), a Korean film
 "The Last Ride" (Brooklyn Nine-Nine), a television episode
 "The Last Ride" (song), a 2022 song by Sidhu Moose Wala
 The Last Ride, a wrestling move performed by The Undertaker
 The Last Ride, a 2020 5-part documentary about The Undertaker